Nitida, Nitidum and Nitidus are forms of the Latin for "bright, shining, sleek, blooming, smart" and may refer to:

Nitida:
 Nitida saga, a 14th-century Icelandic medieval poem

Nitidus:
Barbichthys nitidus, a junior synonym of B. laevis
Eleutherodactylus nitidus, a species of frog in the family Leptodactylidae
Emmelichthys nitidus, a rover species found at depths of between 100 and 500 m
Euryoryzomys nitidus, a rodent species in the genus Euryoryzomys of family Cricetidae
Hemicoelus nitidus, a species of beetles in the genus Hemicoelus of the family Anobiidae
Lichen nitidus, a chronic inflammatory disease of unknown etiology
Limnonectes nitidus, a species of frog in the family Ranidae 
Liolaemus nitidus, known as the shining tree iguana is a species of lizard in the family Iguanidae
Nassarius nitidus, a species of sea snail, a marine gastropod mollusk in the family Nassariidae
Petalonyx nitidus, a species of flowering plant in the family Loasaceae known as shinyleaf sandpaper plant
Phymatodes nitidus, a species of longhorn beetle
Rhabdoblennius nitidus, a species of combtooth blenny found in coral reefs in the western Pacific Ocean
Sphoeroides nitidus, a species in the family Tetraodontidae, or pufferfishes
Stemonoporus nitidus, a species of plant in the family Dipterocarpaceae
Zonitoides nitidus, species of small, air-breathing land snail in the family Gastrodontidae

Nitidum
 Leptospermum nitidum, the shining tea-tree, a shrub species endemic to Tasmania
 Pisidium nitidum, the shining pea clam, a freshwater clam species
 Strioterebrum nitidum, the shiny Pacific auger, a sea snail species
 Zanthoxylum nitidum the shiny-leaf prickly-ash, a flowering plant species
 Meioceras nitidum, a sea snail species

Latin words and phrases